Yegor Vitalievich Chinakhov (born February 1, 2001) is a Russian professional ice hockey right wing currently playing with the Cleveland Monsters in the American Hockey League (AHL) as a prospect under contract to the Columbus Blue Jackets of the National Hockey League (NHL). He was drafted 21st overall by the Blue Jackets in the 2020 NHL Entry Draft.

Playing career
Chinakhov played as a youth within hometown club, Avangard Omsk of the Kontinental Hockey League (KHL). 

After his surprise selection by the Columbus Blue Jackets in the first round of the 2020 NHL Entry Draft, Chinakov made his professional debut with Avangard Omsk in the following 2020–21 KHL season. He was named the Rookie of the Month for the month of September 2020. He recorded three goals and two assists in nine games, averaging 11 minutes and nine seconds of ice time, had 16 shots on goal, recorded five hits, and blocked four shots. He finished with 10 goals and 7 assists for 17 points in 32 regular season games. He led all KHL players 20 years or younger in points-per-game (0.53) and added 5 goals and 7 points in 21 playoff games to help the club win the Gagarin Cup for the first time in franchise history.

Chinakhov was signed by the Columbus Blue Jackets to a three-year, entry-level contract on 2 May 2021.

International play
Chinakhov represented Russia at the 2018 Hlinka Gretzky Cup, where he recorded one goal and two assists in five games, and won a bronze medal. Chinakhov represented Russia at the 2019 IIHF World U18 Championships where he recorded two goals and one assist in seven games, and won a silver medal.

Personal life
Chinakhov is the son of former ice hockey player Vitali Chinakhov who was selected in the 1991 NHL Entry Draft by the New York Rangers, but never played in the NHL.

Career statistics

Regular season and playoffs

International

Awards and honors

References

External links
 

2001 births
Living people
Avangard Omsk players
Cleveland Monsters players
Columbus Blue Jackets draft picks
Columbus Blue Jackets players
HC Izhstal players
National Hockey League first-round draft picks
Russian ice hockey right wingers
Sportspeople from Omsk